Catherine the Great is a 1995 television movie based on the life of Catherine II of Russia. It stars Catherine Zeta-Jones as Catherine, Jeanne Moreau as Empress Elizabeth and Omar Sharif as Alexis Razumovsky.

Plot
A young German Princess (Catherine Zeta-Jones) marries the immature future Tsar Peter III (Hannes Jaenicke). She gradually becomes a skillful politician and rises to become Catherine the Great.

Cast

Catherine Zeta-Jones as Catherine
Paul McGann as Potemkin
Ian Richardson as Vorontzov
Brian Blessed as Bestuzhev
John Rhys-Davies as Pugachev
Craig McLachlan as Saltykov
Hannes Jaenicke as Peter
Agnès Soral as Countess Bruce
Mark McGann as Orlov
Karl Johnson as Sheshkovsky
Stephen McGann as Alexis Orlov
Veronica Ferres as Vorontsova
Mel Ferrer as Patriarch
Jeanne Moreau as Empress Elizabeth Petrovna
Omar Sharif as Razumovsky
Tim McInnerny as Mad Monk
Horst Frank as Schwerin
Vernon Dobtcheff as Naryshkin
Christoph Waltz as Mirovich

Home media
The film was released on Region 1 DVD on February 27, 2001 by A&E Home Video.

External links

References

 https://variety.com/1995/film/reviews/catherine-the-great-1200440516/

1995 films
1995 television films
American television films
Films about Catherine the Great
Depictions of Catherine the Great on television
Films scored by Laurence Rosenthal
Television series set in the 18th century
Films directed by Marvin J. Chomsky
1990s English-language films